Borio refers to a brand of biscuits local to Egypt

It also refers to:
Borio (community development block), in Jharkhand, India
Borio (Vidhan Sabha constituency), an assembly electoral constituency in Jharkhand, India
Borio, Sahibganj, a census town in Jharkhand, India